"Eien no Tsubasa" is the forty-third single by B'z, released on May 9, 2007. It reached number-one on the weekly Oricon Singles Chart, one of B'z many number-one singles in Oricon charts.

Track listing 
  - 5:11
  - 4:49

Certifications

References

 Oricon ranking as of May 2007

External links 
 
 Eien no Tsubasa on B'z no bise (Translation in French)

2007 singles
B'z songs
Oricon Weekly number-one singles
Songs written by Tak Matsumoto
Songs written by Koshi Inaba
2007 songs
Japanese film songs